Goedetrechus is a genus of beetles in the family Carabidae, containing the following species:

 Goedetrechus damperi Eberhard & Giachino, 2011
 Goedetrechus florentinus Eberhard & Giachino, 2011
 Goedetrechus mendumae Moore, 1972
 Goedetrechus minutus Eberhard & Giachino, 2011
 Goedetrechus parallelus Moore, 1972
 Goedetrechus rolani Eberhard & Giachino, 2011
 Goedetrechus talpinus Moore, 1972

References

Trechinae